Koduvayur-II is a village in the Palakkad district, state of Kerala, India. It is administered by the Koduvayur gram panchayat.

Demographics
 India census, Koduvayur-II had a population of 7,965 with 3,858 males and 4,107 females.

References

Koduvayur-II